The Shire of Upper Gascoyne is a local government area in the Gascoyne region of Western Australia, inland from Carnarvon and about  north of the state capital, Perth. It has a population of 170 (2021 census), 56% of whom identify as Aboriginal.

History

The Upper Gascoyne Road District was gazetted on 10 February 1887. On 1 July 1961, it became a Shire under the Local Government Act 1960, which reformed all remaining road districts into shires. The original Road Board office is now a heritage-listed site.

Wards
The shire is divided into 3 wards, each with two councillors:

 North Ward
 South Ward
 East Ward

Towns and localities
The towns and localities of the Shire of Upper Gascoyne with population and size figures based on the most recent Australian census:

Notable councillors
 Everard Darlot, Upper Gascoyne Road Board member 1887; later a state MP
 Lionel Kelly, Upper Gascoyne Road Board member 1927–1928; later a state MP

Heritage-listed places

As of 2021, 19 places are heritage-listed in the Shire of Upper Gascoyne, of which one is on the State Register of Heritage Places, the Upper Gascoyne Road Board Office in Gascoyne Junction.

References

External links
 

 
Upper Gascoyne